Hassela is a locality situated in Nordanstig Municipality, Gävleborg County, Sweden with 364 inhabitants in 2010.

Sister cities
 Center City - Minnesota, USA

References 

Populated places in Nordanstig Municipality
Hälsingland